This Time with Alan Partridge is a British sitcom first broadcast in 2019 on BBC One. It stars Steve Coogan as the inept broadcaster Alan Partridge in a spoof of current affairs programmes such as The One Show and Good Morning Britain.

After a series of productions with Sky, This Time was the first BBC Alan Partridge production since I'm Alan Partridge ended in 2002. Susannah Fielding plays Partridge's co-host Jennie, and Tim Key and Felicity Montagu reprise their roles as Simon Denton and Partridge's assistant Lynn Benfield. The series received generally favourable reviews. A second series was broadcast in 2021.

Premise 
Alan Partridge, an inept broadcaster played by Steve Coogan, becomes the stand-in presenter of This Time after the regular co-host falls ill. According to The Guardian, the show features "Partridgean tirades on everything from hand hygiene (leading him to lurk outside the BBC toilets doing spot-checks on colleagues) to hacking".

Production
Partridge was created in 1991 by Coogan and Armando Iannucci. Following early Partridge shows such as Knowing Me, Knowing You and I'm Alan Partridge, produced by the BBC, This Time was the first BBC Partridge project following several Sky productions. It was produced by Coogan's production company Baby Cow Productions, written by Coogan and the Gibbons brothers, directed by the Gibbons brothers, and produced by Ted Dowd.

Coogan felt it was the right time for Partridge to return, and that he might represent the views of Brexit voters. Neil Gibbons said the world of live television presenting had changed since Partridge had been created: "If someone fluffed a line or got someone’s name wrong or said something stupid, it was mortifying. But nowadays, those are the sort of people who are given jobs on TV." He likened Partridge to presenters such as Piers Morgan, who he felt had been hired to present Good Morning Britain because he said offensive things. Coogan and the Gibbonses ignored this because "if you put Alan in a world where his crass buffoonery is part of the selling point, there's nowhere for him to fall".

A second series was produced in 2020, and was broadcast on BBC One from 30 April 2021.

Reception
This Time with Alan Partridge has received mostly positive reviews. Lucy Mangan of The Guardian wrote that "the differentiation of This Time With Alan Partridges layers and escalation of every exchange is precision-engineered: beautiful things and a joy forever." Tim Glanfield of Radio Times felt it was "some of the best Alan Partridge ever made". Sean O'Grady of The Independent gave it five stars, and found it "a consistently strong creative achievement". The segment with Steve Coogan as Martin Brennan (the Irish Alan Partridge lookalike who closes the show with Irish Republican Army songs) was described by Raidió Teilifís Éireann as "TV moment of the year", which would be remembered "in the canon of truly great Partridge moments."

Hugo Rifkind of The Times was less positive, saying "Only very occasionally does it soar into unexpected places. Still, for a character that came along a quarter of a century ago and still isn't old, maybe fresh delights are a bit too much to ask." Writing for Prospect, Lucinda Smyth argued "This Time is... OK. But it is not the best of British television, it's not even the best of Coogan, and it undermines both to say so... I don't mean to say that there haven't been a few gems in This Time. But overall the timing is patchy, the belly-laughs are few, and the script is tiringly Alan-centric."

The television host Piers Morgan, who is spoofed by This Time, said that Coogan was "trying to exact revenge on me because he now hates everything to do with newspapers... I used to love Alan Partridge, he used to be hilarious, brilliant. It is now utterly unwatchable. Because Coogan has disappeared up his derrière, unfortunately."

Cast
Steve Coogan as Alan Partridge
Susannah Fielding as Jennie Gresham
Tim Key as Simon Denton 
Lolly Adefope as Ruth Duggan
Felicity Montagu as Lynn Benfield
Natasia Demetriou as Tiff (Series 2)

Alex Dee as Floor Manager

Guest appearances

Series 1 (2019)
Episode 1 
Emily Maitlis as herself
Cariad Lloyd as Alice Fluck
Priyanga Burford as Jean Chaudhary

Episode 2 
Peter Wight as John Baskell
Angela Curran as Annie
Simon Farnaby as Sam Chatwin

Episode 3 
Jonathan Watson as Dale Daniels

Episode 4 
Monty Don as himself

Episode 5 
Ellie White as Dee Gilhooly

Episode 6
Katy Wix as Susan Lyle

Series 2 (2021)
Episode 1 
 Leila Farzad as Clarissa Hoskin
 Simon Kunz as Father Paul
 Simon Farnaby as Sam Chatwin

Episode 2 
 John Thomson as Joe Beasley
 Colin Hoult as Howard 
 Clive Hayward as Maurice

Episode 3 
 Matt Smith as Dan Milner
 Nigel Lindsay as Tommy 
 Rosie Cavaliero as Rosie Whitter

Episode 5 
 Nick Mohammed as Bhavit Sharma

Episode 6
 Alex Lowe as Hugh Bevell
 Eleanor Matsuura as Professor Rebecca Burns

Episodes

Series 1 (2019)

Series 2 (2021)

References

External links

2019 British television series debuts
2010s British satirical television series
2020s British satirical television series
BBC satirical television shows
British parody television series
English-language television shows
Television series about television
Fictional television shows